Doxa Megalopoli ("Glory") (Greek: Α.Ο. Δόξα Μεγαλόπολης A.O. Doxa Megalopoli) is a Greek football (soccer) club in Megalopoli in Arcadia.  The club was created in 1956 and is one of the oldest club in the city.  The team won 8 titles and 8 cups in Arcadia FCA and played for several seasons in the national Third and Fourth Division.  Their greatest success occurred in 2007 when they won the Greek Amateur Cup by beating Kilkisiakos 1–0 in Lamia.  For a year in 1978, they were finalist in one of the minimum games in which they made it twice into the final of the Greek organization. The team partispates in Third division in Greece .  Their colours are blue and white and plays at Megalopoli Public Athletic Center with 500 seats, in which the field is turf.

Titles – Successes

Greek Amateur Cup (1):
2007, final:
Lamia National Stadium: Doxa Megalopoli 1–0 Kilkisiakos
Finalist Greek Amateur Cup, 1978, final:
Tavros Field: Panaspropyrgiakos – Doxa Megalopoli: 1–0 (draw)
Arcadia Championships (8):
1977, 1979, 1981, 1983, 1986, 1993, 1995, 2006
Arcadia Cup (8):
1977–78: Doxa Megalopoli – Leonidi FC: 2–0
1978–79: Doxa Megalopoli – Leonidi: 1–1 [2–1 (draw)]
1980–81: Doxa Megalopoli – Leonidi: 2–0
1993–94: Doxa Megalopoli – Asteras Tripoli: 1–0
1995–96: Foca Megalopoli – Leonidi: 1–0
2000–01: Doxa Megalopoli – Panthyreatikos: 1–1 [4–2 pen.]
2005–06: Doxa Megalopoli – Leonidi: 4–3
2006–07: Doxa Megalopoli – Panthyreatikos: 2–1
Finalist Arcadia Cup (4):
1984–85: Leonidi – Doxa Megalopoli: 1–1 [4–1 pen]
2007–08: Leonidi – Doxa Megalopoli: 3–1
2014–15: Panarcadicos – Doxa Megalopoli: 2–0
2015–16: Panarcadicos – Doxa Megalopoli: 2–1

In national divisions

Third Division:
1977–78 (2nd Group): 15th place/20 matches, relegated, 31 pts. (31–48).
1979–80 (2nd Group): 18th place/20th matches, relegated, 12 pts. (29–98).
1981–82 (3rd Group): 11th place/15 matches, relegated, 17 pts. (31–41).
Fourth Division:
1983–84 (4th Group): 17th place/18 matches, relegated, 16 pts. (25–63).
1986–87 (4th Group): 17th place/18 matches, relegated, 15 pts. (20–68).
1993–94: relegated.
1995–96 (3rd Group): 16th place/18 matches, relegated 17 pts. (17–81).
2006–07 season (7th group): 5th place/16 matches, 50 pts. (37–23).
2007–08 season (7th group): 15 matches, remained.
2008–09 season (7th Group): 18th place/18 matches, relegated, 1 pt. (13–112).

References

External links
Doxa Megalopoli on Facebook 
Doxa Megalopoli at Arcadia FCA 

Sport in Arcadia, Peloponnese
Association football clubs established in 1956
Football clubs in Peloponnese (region)
1956 establishments in Greece